USS Reaper (AMc-96) was an Accentor-class coastal minesweeper acquired by the U.S. Navy for the hazardous task of removing mines from minefields laid in the water to prevent ships from passing.

Reaper was laid down 1 June 1941 by Noank Shipbuilding Co., Noank, Connecticut, launched 15 April 1942; and placed in service 14 November 1942.

World War II service 
During World War II, Reaper conducted minesweeping patrols in the Caribbean, and operated out of San Juan, Puerto Rico. Placed out of service 15 November 1945, she was struck from the Navy list on the 28th and sold 19 September 1946 by the Maritime Commission at Charleston, South Carolina, to Harry Mogck of Cape May Boat Works, Cape May, New Jersey.

References

External links 
 NavSource Online: Mine Warfare Vessel Photo Archive - Reaper (AMc 96) - ex-Power

 

Accentor-class minesweepers
Ships built in Groton, Connecticut
1942 ships
World War II minesweepers of the United States